Red letter day is a special day of the year, marked by red color in calendar.

Red letter day may also refer to:

Organisations
 Red Letter Days, a UK company

Music
 Red Letter Day (band), English punk rock band
 Red Letter Days (album), an album by The Wallflowers
 Red Letter Day (EP), an EP release by The Get Up Kids
 "A Red Letter Day", a single from the Pet Shop Boys

Other
 Red letter day, a chapter in the video game Half-Life 2
Red ink